Jamirah Patra Gaon is a village in Dibrugarh district of Assam state of India.

References

Villages in Dibrugarh district